The Cumberland Association was a legal governing body formed in 1780 to establish the efficient government of the early settlers along the Cumberland River in the area of what is now Nashville, Tennessee. The association was formed upon the signing of the Cumberland Compact. The Cumberland Association was officially recognized by the granting authority, the State of North Carolina.

Although formed in 1780, the Cumberland Association was dormant until 1783.

References

Davidson County, Tennessee
History of Nashville, Tennessee